Club Deportivo Calahorra is a Spanish football team based in Calahorra, in the autonomous community of La Rioja. Founded in 1946 it plays in Primera División RFEF – Group 2, holding home games at the Estadio Municipal La Planilla, with a capacity of 5,000 spectators.

History 
In the 2003-04 season the club was relegated from Segunda División B to Tercera.

Season to season

2 seasons in Primera División RFEF
11 seasons in Segunda División B
50 seasons in Tercera División

Current squad
.

See also
CD Calahorra B, reserve team

Honours
Tercera División
Champions (9): 1987–88, 1991–92, 1994–95, 1995–96, 1997–98, 2004–05, 2015–16, 2016–17, 2017–18

References

External links
 
Futbolme team profile 
Estadios de España 

Football clubs in La Rioja (Spain)
Association football clubs established in 1946
1946 establishments in Spain
Primera Federación clubs
Football clubs in Spain